was a Japanese anatomist of the Meiji period.

He graduated from Tokyo Imperial University medical school. Then he studied abroad in Switzerland. He was assistant of the University of Zurich from 1907 to 1911 and from 1914 to 1916 and worked with Constantin von Monakow.

His name is lent to the Kölliker-Fuse nucleus.

Bibliography
 Fischer I: Biographisches Lexikon der hervorragenden Ärzte der letzten fünfzig Jahre. Band 1. München-Berlin: Urban & Schwarzenberg, 1962, p. 468
 Satake Y. Gennosuke Fuse; in memoriam. Tohoku J Exp Med. 63. 2-3: 103-8 (1956). . 
 Tomoyuki Ogawa. GENNOSUKE FUSE - A Great Master of Anatomy, Omnividens No. 22, pp. 6–8, 2007 PDF

External links
  Tohoku University Medical Library

Japanese anatomists
University of Tokyo alumni
People associated with the University of Zurich
1946 deaths
Laureates of the Imperial Prize
1880 births
People from Otaru